Kwakye is a surname. Notable people with the surname include:

 Benjamin Kwakye (born 1967), Ghanaian novelist and lawyer
 Isaac Kwakye (born 1977), Ghanaian footballer
 Jeanette Kwakye (born 1983), English sprinter and sports broadcaster
 Kwabena Kwakye Anti (born 1923), Ghanaian lecturer and politician